Hoàng Xuân Vinh (born October 6, 1974 in Hanoi) is a Vietnamese sport shooter.

Xuân Vinh participated in the 2012, 2016 and 2020 Summer Olympics. He won a gold medal in the 10 meter air pistol and a silver in the 50 meter pistol competitions in 2016 Summer Olympics, being the first-ever and currently only athlete from his country to win an Olympic gold medal.

Career 
Xuân Vinh's professional career in sports shooting spans two Summer Olympic games.

2012 Summer Olympics
At the 2012 Summer Olympics, he finished 9th in the qualifying round for 10 meter air pistol, failing to make the cut to the final by a single point. He also failed to win a medal in the 50 meter pistol final, taking the 4th place  with a score only 0.1 less than the winner of the bronze medal.

2016 Summer Olympics
In 2016, he became the first Vietnamese athlete to win a gold medal in the history of the Summer Olympics, beating Brazil's Felipe Wu in the final round of the 10 meter air pistol competition with a score of 202.5 against 202.1 of the Brazilian, which also set an Olympic record after ISSF rules' change on January 1, 2013. He also won the silver medal in the 50 meter pistol competition, making him the first Vietnamese athlete to earn two Olympic medals.

References

External links
 

Vietnamese male sport shooters
1974 births
Living people
Olympic shooters of Vietnam
Shooters at the 2012 Summer Olympics
Shooters at the 2016 Summer Olympics
Asian Games medalists in shooting
Shooters at the 2006 Asian Games
Shooters at the 2010 Asian Games
Shooters at the 2014 Asian Games
Asian Games bronze medalists for Vietnam
Olympic gold medalists for Vietnam
Olympic silver medalists for Vietnam
Olympic medalists in shooting
Medalists at the 2016 Summer Olympics
Shooters at the 2020 Summer Olympics
Medalists at the 2006 Asian Games
Medalists at the 2014 Asian Games
Sportspeople from Hanoi
Southeast Asian Games gold medalists for Vietnam
Southeast Asian Games silver medalists for Vietnam
Southeast Asian Games bronze medalists for Vietnam
Southeast Asian Games medalists in shooting
Shooters at the 2018 Asian Games
Competitors at the 2005 Southeast Asian Games
Competitors at the 2007 Southeast Asian Games
Competitors at the 2011 Southeast Asian Games
Competitors at the 2013 Southeast Asian Games
Competitors at the 2015 Southeast Asian Games
Competitors at the 2019 Southeast Asian Games
20th-century Vietnamese people
21st-century Vietnamese people